Nagasaki  (written: 長崎) is a Japanese surname. Notable people with the surname include:

, Japanese swimmer
, Japanese director
, Japanese footballer
, Japanese politician
, Japanese table tennis player.
, Japanese film director and screenwriter
, Japanese author, manga writer and former editor of manga

Japanese-language surnames